The Buckhead Theatre is a theatre located in the Buckhead neighborhood of Atlanta, Georgia, United States.

History
The establishment was built in 1930 in Spanish baroque style by Atlanta architecture firm Daniell & Beutell and opened on June 2, 1930. Primarily functioning as a second-run movie theater, it also hosted civic functions and concerts of the Buckhead Symphony Orchestra. It was operated by Affiliated Theaters, a subsidiary of McLendon Theatres. Lease holders Davis & Coart sold the lease in 1935 to the company Terry McDaniel of Montgomery.

In 1961, it converted to a first run policy and joined the Weis Theater chain as the Capri Theatre. In the mid-1980s, it was called Buckhead Cinema ‘N’ Drafthouse, until it was converted into the Coca-Cola Roxy Theatre.

A significant Atlanta concert venue in the 1990s and most of the 2000s, the Roxy finally closed after LiveNation and Clear Channel ended their lease in 2008. It was then purchased by Aaron's, Inc., founder Charles Loudermilk. After two years of renovation, the venue reopened in June 2010 under the original name Buckhead Theatre.

Performers

A Day To Remember
Aaron Carter
The Airborne Toxic Event
Albert Hammond Jr.
Andrew McMahon in the Wilderness
The Babys
Beats Antique
The Boomtown Rats
Bruce Hampton
Camper Van Beethoven
Chapo Trap House
Chvrches
The Devil Wears Prada
Danny Ocean
Dixie Dregs
Dua Lipa
Elektric Band II
Falling In Reverse
Feid
Finch
Fifth Harmony
The Gaslight Anthem
Gavin DeGraw
Hanson
Harry Styles
Indigo Girls
Issues
Jessie James Decker
JoJo
Kesha
King Crimson
LANY
Lou Reed
Melanie Martinez
The Minimalists
MisterWives
Morat (band)
Mumford & Sons
The New Pornographers
The Offspring
Pat Green
Papa Roach
Peter Tosh
Phish
Paul Westerberg
Randall Bramblett
Ray Charles
Sarah Vaughan
Scissor Sisters
Sea Level
Talking Heads
The The
Tinashe
Tragically Hip
Travis Tritt
Waylon Jennings
Wynonna Judd

References

Theatres in Atlanta
Theatres completed in 1930
Cinemas and movie theaters in Georgia (U.S. state)
Concert halls in the United States
Music venues in Georgia (U.S. state)
1930 establishments in Georgia (U.S. state)
Baroque Revival architecture in the United States